In nuclear engineering, fissile material is material capable of sustaining a nuclear fission chain reaction. By definition, fissile material can sustain a chain reaction with neutrons of thermal energy. The predominant neutron energy may be typified by either slow neutrons (i.e., a thermal system) or fast neutrons. Fissile material can be used to fuel thermal-neutron reactors, fast-neutron reactors and nuclear explosives.

Fissile vs fissionable 

The term fissile is distinct from fissionable.  A nuclide capable of undergoing fission (even with a low probability) after capturing a neutron of high or low energy is referred to as fissionable. A fissionable nuclide that can be induced to fission with low-energy thermal neutrons with a high probability is referred to as fissile.  Fissionable materials include also those (such as uranium-238) for which fission can be induced only by high-energy neutrons.  As a result, fissile materials (such as uranium-235) are a subset of fissionable materials.

Uranium-235 fissions with low-energy thermal neutrons because the binding energy resulting from the absorption of a neutron is greater than the critical energy required for fission; therefore uranium-235 is a fissile.  By contrast, the binding energy released by uranium-238 absorbing a thermal neutron is less than the critical energy, so the neutron must possess additional energy for fission to be possible. Consequently, uranium-238 is fissionable but not fissile.

An alternative definition defines fissile nuclides as those nuclides that can be made to undergo nuclear fission (i.e., are fissionable) and also produce neutrons from such fission that can sustain a nuclear chain reaction in the correct setting.  Under this definition, the only nuclides that are fissionable but not fissile are those nuclides that can be made to undergo nuclear fission but produce insufficient neutrons, in either energy or number, to sustain a nuclear chain reaction.  As such, while all fissile isotopes are fissionable, not all fissionable isotopes are fissile.  In the arms control context, particularly in proposals for a Fissile Material Cutoff Treaty, the term fissile is often used to describe materials that can be used in the fission primary of a nuclear weapon.  These are materials that sustain an explosive fast neutron nuclear fission chain reaction.

Under all definitions above, uranium-238 is fissionable, but because it cannot sustain a neutron chain reaction, it is not fissile.

Fast fission of  tampers has also been evident in pure fission weapons. The fast fission of  also makes a significant contribution to the power output of some fast-neutron reactors.

Fissile nuclides 

In general, most actinide isotopes with an odd neutron number are fissile. Most nuclear fuels have an odd atomic mass number ( = the total number of nucleons), and an even atomic number Z. This implies an odd number of neutrons. Isotopes with an odd number of neutrons gain an extra 1 to 2 MeV of energy from absorbing an extra neutron, from the pairing effect which favors even numbers of both neutrons and protons. This energy is enough to supply the needed extra energy for fission by slower neutrons, which is important for making fissionable isotopes also fissile.

More generally, nuclides with an even number of protons and an even number of neutrons, and located near a well-known curve in nuclear physics of atomic number vs. atomic mass number are more stable than others; hence, they are less likely to undergo fission. They are more likely to "ignore" the neutron and let it go on its way, or else to absorb the neutron but without gaining enough energy from the process to deform the nucleus enough for it to fission. These "even-even" isotopes are also less likely to undergo spontaneous fission, and they also have relatively much longer partial half-lives for alpha or beta decay. Examples of these isotopes are uranium-238 and thorium-232. On the other hand, other than the lightest nuclides, nuclides with an odd number of protons and an odd number of neutrons  (odd Z, odd N) are usually short-lived (a notable exception is neptunium-236 with a half-life of 154,000 years) because they readily decay by beta-particle emission to their isobars with an even number of protons and an even number of neutrons (even Z, even N) becoming much more stable.  The physical basis for this phenomenon also comes from the pairing effect in nuclear binding energy, but this time from both proton–proton and neutron–neutron pairing. The relatively short half-life of such odd-odd heavy isotopes means that they are not available in quantity and are highly radioactive.

Nuclear fuel 

To be a useful fuel for nuclear fission chain reactions, the material must:

 Be in the region of the binding energy curve where a fission chain reaction is possible (i.e., above radium)
 Have a high probability of fission on neutron capture
 Release more than one neutron on average per neutron capture. (Enough of them on each fission, to compensate for non-fissions and absorptions in the moderator)
 Have a reasonably long half-life
 Be available in suitable quantities

Fissile nuclides in nuclear fuels include:

 Uranium-233 bred from thorium-232 by neutron capture with intermediate decays steps omitted.
 Uranium-235 which occurs in natural uranium and enriched uranium
 Plutonium-239 bred from uranium-238 by neutron capture with intermediate decays steps omitted.
 Plutonium-241 bred from plutonium-240 directly by neutron capture.
Fissile nuclides do not have a 100% chance of undergoing fission on absorption of a neutron. The chance is dependent on the nuclide as well as neutron energy. For low and medium-energy neutrons, the neutron capture cross sections for fission (σF), the cross section for neutron capture with emission of a gamma ray (σγ), and the percentage of non-fissions are in the table at right.

Fertile nuclides in nuclear fuels include:

 Thorium-232 which breeds Uranium-233 by neutron capture with intermediate decays steps omitted.
 Uranium-238 which breeds Plutonium-239 by neutron capture with intermediate decays steps omitted.
 Plutonium-240 bred from plutonium-239 directly by neutron capture.

See also 
 Fertile material
 Fission product
 Special nuclear material

Notes

References 

 
Nuclear physics
Nuclear fission
Nuclear weapon design